Homeobox A4, also known as HOXA4, is a protein which in humans is encoded by the HOXA4 gene.

Function 

In vertebrates, the genes encoding the class of transcription factors called homeobox genes are found in clusters named A, B, C, and D on four separate chromosomes.  Expression of these proteins is spatially and temporally regulated during embryonic development. This gene is part of the A cluster on chromosome 7 and encodes a DNA-binding transcription factor which may regulate gene expression, morphogenesis, and differentiation.

See also
 Homeobox

References

Further reading

External links 
 

Transcription factors